Yamamoto (written:  lit. "base of the mountain") is the 9th most common Japanese surname. Notable people with the surname include:

, Japanese politician
, Japanese World War II flying ace
, Japanese judoka
, Japanese manga artist and character designer
, Japanese Paralympic athlete
, Japanese actress, voice actress and idol
, Japanese gravure idol, actress and television personality
, Japanese painter
Beatriz Yamamoto Cázarez (born 1950), Mexican politician
, Japanese actress
, birth name of Japanese yakuza boss Shimizu Jirocho
, Japanese footballer
Donald Yamamoto (born 1953), American diplomat
, Filipino-born Japanese basketball player
, Japanese film director and screenwriter
, Japanese women's footballer
Eric Yamamoto, American legal scholar
, Japanese footballer
, Japanese actress
, Japanese Zen Buddhist
, Japanese cyclist
, Japanese Nordic combined skier
, Imperial Japanese Navy admiral and Prime Minister of Japan
Guy Yamamoto (born 1961), American golfer
, Japanese manga artist
, Japanese karateka
, Japanese footballer
, Japanese actress
, American bassist
Hiroki Yamamoto (disambiguation), multiple people
, Japanese footballer
, Japanese speed skater
Hiroshi Yamamoto (disambiguation), multiple people
, Japanese footballer
Hiroyuki Yamamoto (disambiguation), multiple people
, Japanese organic chemist
Hisaye Yamamoto (1921–2011), Japanese-American writer
, Japanese painter
, Japanese shakuhachi player, composer and lecturer
, Japanese politician
, Japanese sport wrestler
, Imperial Japanese Navy admiral killed during World War II
, Japanese astronomer
, Japanese businessman and politician
Junichi Yamamoto (disambiguation), multiple people
, Japanese politician
Kailer Yamamoto, (born 1998), American ice hockey player
, Japanese footballer
, Japanese film director, screenwriter and actor
, Japanese samurai
Kanae Yamamoto (disambiguation), multiple people
, Japanese Bahá'í
, Japanese fashion designer
Kansuke Yamamoto (disambiguation), multiple people
, Japanese racing driver
, Japanese rower
, Japanese baseball player
, Japanese voice actor and singer
, Japanese actor
, Japanese voice actress
Keith Yamamoto (born 1946), American scientist
Kenichi Yamamoto (disambiguation), multiple people
Kenji Yamamoto (disambiguation), multiple people
, pen name of Ishibashi Teikichi, Japanese writer and literary critic
, Japanese handball player
Kohei Yamamoto (disambiguation), multiple people
, Japanese politician
Koji Yamamoto (disambiguation), multiple people
, Japanese rugby union player
, Japanese footballer
, Japanese professional wrestler
, Japanese politician
, Japanese musician, singer-songwriter and record producer
, Japanese singer and actress
, Japanese women's basketball player
, Japanese actress, television personality and model
, Japanese voice actress and singer
, Japanese cricketer
, Japanese speed skater
Masahiro Yamamoto (disambiguation), multiple people
, Japanese rugby union player
, Japanese footballer
Masaki Yamamoto (cyclist) (born 1996), Japanese cyclist
, Japanese footballer and manager
, Japanese cyclist
, Japanese photographer
, Japanese rower
, Japanese film director
, Japanese baseball player
, Japanese footballer
, Japanese artistic gymnast
, Japanese swimmer
Mayumi Yamamoto (disambiguation), multiple people
Mia Yamamoto, American activist
, Japanese writer and poet
Michiko Yamamoto (screenwriter) (born 1979), Filipino screenwriter
, Japanese journalist
, Japanese scientist
, Japanese classical composer
, Japanese actress
, Japanese sport wrestler and mixed martial artist
, Japanese actress and model
, Japanese announcer
Naoki Yamamoto (disambiguation), multiple people
Naomi Yamamoto, Canadian politician
, Japanese actress
, Japanese mixed martial artist and kickboxer
, Japanese swimmer
, Japanese footballer
, Japanese voice actress
, Japanese footballer
Richard K. Yamamoto (1935–2009), American physicist
, Japanese footballer
, Japanese architect
, Japanese actor
, Japanese long-distance runner
, Japanese R&B singer
, Japanese triple jumper
Ryosuke Yamamoto (disambiguation), multiple people
, Japanese footballer
, Japanese alpine skier
, Japanese women's basketball player
, Japanese javelin thrower
, Japanese racing driver
, Japanese gravure idol
, Grand Chamberlain of Japan
, Japanese manga artist
, Japanese film director
, Japanese singer, model, and idol
, Japanese anime director
, Japanese drifting driver
, Japanese musician
, Japanese chef
, Japanese sport wrestler
, Japanese pole vaulter
Shinji Yamamoto (disambiguation), multiple people
, Japanese shogi player
, Japanese badminton player
, Japanese baseball player
, Japanese footballer
, Japanese actor
, Japanese artist
, Japanese baseball player
, Japanese writer
, Japanese footballer
, Japanese figure skater
Stênio Yamamoto (born 1961), Brazilian sport shooter
, Japanese manga artist
, Japanese diplomat
Tadashi Yamamoto (1936–2012), Japanese internationalist
, Japanese triple jumper
Taisei Yamamoto (born 2001), Japanese freestyle skier
, Japanese volleyball player
Takashi Yamamoto (disambiguation), multiple people
, Japanese motorcycle racer
, Japanese politician
, Japanese footballer
, Japanese politician and actor
Taro Yamamoto (artist) (1919–1994), American artist
, Japanese samurai
, Japanese politician
, Japanese baseball player
Thomas Yamamoto (1917–2004), American artist
, Japanese actor
Tojo Yamamoto (1927–1992), American professional wrestler
, Japanese politician
, Japanese volleyball player
, Japanese physician
Toshiki Yamamoto (born 1991), Japanese weightlifter
Toshio Yamamoto (disambiguation), multiple people
, Japanese samurai and author of the Hagakure
, Japanese jazz pianist and composer
Wil Yamamoto (born 1974), Guamanian cyclist
, Japanese manga artist
Yasufumi Yamamoto (born 1971), Japanese tennis player
, Japanese manga artist
, Japanese anime director
, Japanese fashion designer
, Japanese actress
, Japanese swimmer
Yoshihisa Yamamoto (disambiguation), multiple people
, Japanese footballer
, Japanese baseball player
, Japanese golfer
, Japanese judoka
, Japanese football referee
, Japanese politician
, Japanese field hockey player
, Japanese voice actress
, Japanese actor
, Japanese anime director
, Japanese mathematician
, Japanese footballer
, Japanese fashion model
, Japanese kickboxer
, Japanese writer and playwright

Fictional characters
, a character in the manga series Spriggan
Lt. Yamamoto, a character in the anime series The Irresponsible Captain Tylor
Akane Yamamoto, a character in manga series Haikyū!!
Aki Yamamoto, a character in the manga series Colorful
, a character in the manga series Bleach
Julie Yamamoto, a character in the television series Ben 10: Alien Force
, a character in the manga series S · A: Special A
, a character in the novel Battle Royale
, a character in the manga series S · A: Special A
, a character in the manga series Reborn!
, a character in the anime series Starship Girl Yamamoto Yohko
Yamamoto Yueniang, a character in the television series The Little Nyonya

References

See also
 Yamoto (disambiguation)

Japanese-language surnames